Zsigmond Villányi (1 January 1950 – 13 January 1995) was a Hungarian modern pentathlete. He competed at the 1972 Summer Olympics winning a silver medal in the team event.

References

1950 births
1995 deaths
Hungarian male modern pentathletes
Olympic modern pentathletes of Hungary
Modern pentathletes at the 1972 Summer Olympics
Olympic silver medalists for Hungary
Olympic medalists in modern pentathlon
People from Hercegszántó
Medalists at the 1972 Summer Olympics
Sportspeople from Bács-Kiskun County
20th-century Hungarian people